The list of ship decommissionings in 1962 includes a chronological list of all ships decommissioned in 1962.


See also 

1962
 Ship decommissionings
Ship